Samurai: Way of the Warrior is an action video game for iOS. It was developed by Madfinger Games.

Development
The game was the first title by Madfinger Games and was released in 2009. Developers were at the time employees of 2K Czech and worked on it at their free time before they officially founded a company in May 2010.

When the company was founded, the developers decided to release an updated version of the game as Samurai: Way of the Warrior HD.

Plot 
The story is told through comic book cutscenes. It is about a wandering samurai Daisuke Shimada as he is dealing with villainous Lord Hattoro and his henchmen Kumo and Orochi. Before he can face them he has to defeat their army.

Gameplay
The game features a story mode and a Dojo mode. The story mode consists of 7 chapters where the player fights multiple enemies of a different type. To fight them he can use 12 different combos. Dojo mode is on the other hand a survival mode where the player has to survive as long as he can.

Reception
The most of reviews were positive. It gained praise for its visual, controls and gameplay. Some reviewers on the other hand criticised the repetitiveness and briefness. The game also won a few awards. It includes elected by Apple as one of the Best Games of 2009; Best App Ever Awards 2009 – Best Game Graphics Honorable Mention Award from 148Apps; and number 16 in the Top 100 iPhone Games of All Time from AppAdvice.

Sequel 
The sequel Samurai II: Vengeance was released in 2010. The game included a new story of Daisuke and new elements such as interactive environment.

References

External links 
 Official site

2009 video games
Action video games
Hack and slash games
IOS games
IOS-only games
Japan in non-Japanese culture
Madfinger Games games
Single-player video games
Video games about samurai
Video games developed in the Czech Republic
Video games set in feudal Japan
Video games with cel-shaded animation